Elections were held on 1 May 2003 to elect 65 local councillors for Bath and North East Somerset Council. The results are shown below. Following the election, a coalition was formed between the Liberal Democrats and Conservative councillors. Cllr Paul Crossley became leader of the council.

Election results

Ward results
The ward results listed below are based on the changes from the 1999 elections, not taking into account any party defections or by-elections. Sitting councillors are marked with an asterisk (*).

Abbey

Bathavon North

Bathavon South

Bathavon West

Bathwick

Chew Valley North

Chew Valley South

Clutton

Combe Down

Farmborough

High Littleton

Keynsham East

Keynsham North

Keynsham South

Kingsmead

Lambridge

Lansdown

Lyncombe

Mendip

Midsomer Norton North

Midsomer Norton Redfield

Newbridge

Odd Down

Oldfield

Paulton

Peasedown

Publow with Whitchurch

Radstock

Saltford

Southdown

Timsbury

Twerton

Walcot

Westfield

Westmoreland

Weston

Widcombe

References
General

Specific

2003 English local elections
2003
2000s in Somerset